Darkhana railway station (Urdu and ) is located in Darkhana town, Khanewal district of Punjab province, Pakistan.

See also
 List of railway stations in Pakistan
 Pakistan Railways

References

External links

Railway stations in Khanewal District
Railway stations on Khanewal–Wazirabad Line